Nampo Station may refer to:
 Nampo Station (Busan)
Namp'o Station (P'yŏngnam Line)
Nampo Station (Boryeong)